Baker Township is a township in O'Brien County, Iowa, USA.

History
Baker Township was founded in the 1870s. The township was named for General N. B. Baker, who played an active role in creating it.

References

Townships in O'Brien County, Iowa
Townships in Iowa
Populated places established in the 1870s